The 2022 Flower City Union season was the club's first season of existence, and their first in the National Independent Soccer Association (NISA), the third tier of American soccer. The Union's season began on March 26, 2022 and concluded on October 10, 2022.

The Union finished at the bottom of the NISA table.

Background 
The club's history begins in 2017, when the long-time professional soccer club in the Rochester metropolitan area, the Rochester Rhinos announced they were going on a hiatus beginning in 2018. The hiatus left the city without a professional soccer team for the first time since 19985, and left the city's soccer-specific stadium, Marina Auto Stadium, without a main tenant. 

In 2020, a ownership group headed by David Weaver, the CEO and founder of Rochester-based Aphex BioCleanse Systems Inc. and a former Kodak optical engineer, submitted an application for a NISA team in Rochester. Mark Washo, a former Chief Business Officer with the Rhinos was appointed as Managing Director and Chief Commercial Officer and the group later announced a partnership with St. John Fisher College’s Sport Management Department. 

On December 17, 2020, NISA approved the group's expansion application, and the following day, it was revealed that the club's name would be the Flower City Union, a nod to Rochester's nickname as the Flower City. On April 14, 2021, the team logo and colors were introduced, the primary color being Lilac purple in honor of Rochester's signature flower.

Club

Team management 

Sources:

Roster

Non-competitive

Competitions

NISA

Standings

Results summary

Match results

U.S. Open Cup

NISA Independent Cup

Statistics

Appearances and goals 
Numbers after plus-sign(+) denote appearances as a substitute.

|-

|-
!colspan="4"|Total
!16!!10!!7!!4!!0!!0!!2!!1!!0!!0!!0!!0

References

External links 
 Flower City Union

2022
2022 National Independent Soccer Association season
American soccer clubs 2022 season
2022 in sports in New York (state)